Beatty Creek may refer to:

Beatty Creek (California) - a stream in Humboldt County, California
Beatty Creek (Tahltan River) - a stream in northwest British Columbia
Beatty Creek (Washington) - a stream in Washington state

See also
Beaty Creek - a stream in Arkansas and Oklahoma